The Hugo Award for Best Semiprozine is given each year to a periodical publication related to science fiction or fantasy that meets several criteria having to do with the number of issues published and who, if anyone, receives payment. The award was first presented in 1984, and has been given annually since, though the qualifying criteria have changed. Awards were once also given out for professional magazines in the professional magazine category, and are still awarded for fan magazines in the fanzine category.

In addition to the regular Hugo awards, beginning in 1996 Retrospective Hugo Awards, or "Retro Hugos", have been available to be awarded for years 50, 75, or 100 years prior in which no awards were given. To date, Retro Hugo awards have been awarded for 1939, 1941, 1943–1946, 1951, and 1954, but for each of those years, the Semiprozine category failed to receive enough nominating votes to form a ballot.

At the 2008 business meeting, an amendment to the World Science Fiction Society's Constitution was passed that would have removed the Semiprozine category. The vote to ratify this amendment was held the following year; the ratification failed and the category remained. Instead, a committee was formed to recommend improvements to the category and related categories.

History of winners and nominees
During the 39 nomination years, 39 magazines have been nominated. Of these, only 9 magazines run by 31 editors have won. Locus won 22 times and was nominated every year until a rules change in 2012 made it ineligible for the category. Uncanny Magazine has won 6 times out of 7 nominations, including 5 times in a row in 2016–2020, while Science Fiction Chronicle, Clarkesworld Magazine, and Lightspeed are the only other magazines to win more than once, with 2 awards out of 18 nominations, 3 out of 4, and 2 out of 5, respectively. Ansible has won 1 out of 7 nominations, Interzone has won 1 out of 28, and Weird Tales and FIYAH Magazine of Black Speculative Fiction have each won 1 out of 4 nominations. As editor of Locus Charles N. Brown won 21 of 27 nominations, though he shared 5 of those awards with Kirsten Gong-Wong, 3 with Liza Groen Trombi and 2 with Jennifer A. Hall; as Locus editor Liza Groen Trombi won 1 shared with Kirsten Gong-Wong. Uncannys awards were primarily earned by a team of 5 people, Lynne M. Thomas, Michael Damian Thomas, Michi Trota, Erika Ensign, and Steven Schapansky. The sole editor for Chronicles awards was Andrew I. Porter, while David Pringle earned Interzones, and Ann VanderMeer and Stephen H. Segal were the editors for Weird Taless victory. Lightspeeds wins were under John Joseph Adams, Rich Horton, and Stefan Rudnicki, with Wendy N. Wagner and Christie Yant added for the second win, while David Langford was the editor when Ansible was awarded. Clarkesworld Magazines winning years were under Neil Clarke, Sean Wallace, and Kate Baker, with 2 of the three also under Cheryl Morgan and the other under Jason Heller. FIYAHs win was under Troy L. Wiggins, DaVaun Sanders, Eboni Dunbar, Brandon O'Brien, Brent Lambert, and L. D. Lewis. The New York Review of Science Fiction has received the most number of nominations without ever winning at 22, under the helm of David G. Hartwell, Kathryn Cramer, Kevin J. Maroney, and 8 other editors.

The Hugo Award nomination process
Hugo Award nominees and winners are chosen by supporting or attending members of the annual World Science Fiction Convention (Worldcon). The selection process is defined in the World Science Fiction Society Constitution as instant-runoff voting among six nominees, or more in the case of a tie. The works on the ballot are the ones nominated by members that year, ranked according to a complex algorithm, with no limit on the number of works that can be nominated. The 1953 through 1956 and 1958 awards did not include any recognition of runner-up magazines, but since 1959 all six candidates were recorded. Initial nominations are made by members in the first months of each year, while voters vote on the ballot of six nominations in the middle of the year, with exact timing varying from year to year. Prior to 2017, the final ballot consisted of five works; it was changed that year to six, with each initial nominator limited to five nominations.

Winners and nominees 
In the following table, the years correspond to the date of the ceremony, rather than when the work was first published. Each date links to the "year in literature" article corresponding with when the work was eligible. Entries with a blue background  won the award for that year; those with a white background are the other nominees on the short-list. Note that Thrust was renamed to Quantum and was nominated under both names; no other nominated magazine has undergone a name change during the period the award has been active.

  *   Winners and joint winners

Notes

References

External links
Hugo Award official site

Semiprozine
Literary awards for magazines
Awards established in 1984